Bogdan ”Bobe” Nicolescu (born January 3, 1997) is a Romanian basketball player for CSM U Oradea, and the captain of the Romanian national team. He participated at the EuroBasket 2017. Bobe is playing in Oradea since 2015 and was part of all of the trophies that team has ever won in Romanian League  (2016, 2018, 2019). He was part of two All-Star Games, being voted MVP in both of them.

References

External links
 
 
 
 Nicolae-Bogdan Nicolescu at RealGM
 

1997 births
Living people
Basketball players at the 2014 Summer Youth Olympics
CSM Oradea (basketball) players
Romanian men's basketball players
Small forwards
Basketball players from Bucharest